Ed Bereal (born 1937) is an American artist best known for his work in assemblage and for his participation in exhibitions and performances that addressed political issues and racial stereotypes from the 1960s onward. In 1961, his work was included in the controversial exhibition War Babies at the Huysman Gallery in Los Angeles, along with work by Larry Bell, Joe Goode, and Ron Miyashiro. In 2022, Marian Goodman Gallery featured historical work from this exhibition in their Paris bookstore, Librairie Marian Goodman, in the exhibition War Babies and the Studs.

Bereal was a founding member of the 1960s radical street theater group Bodacious Buggerrilla. In 2012, the group was featured in the Getty Center's Performance and Public Art Festival as part of "Pacific Standard Time: Art in L.A., 1945-1980". This event was part of a series entitled "Talks about Acts," organized by Malik and Alexandro Segade.

Education

1959-62 Chouinard Art Institute
1962-68 private studies with John Chamberlain
Private studies with John Altoon and Peter Voulkos

Recent exhibitions
2022 Librairie Marian Goodman, Paris
2004 Elizabeth Leach Gallery, Portland OR
2006 Centre Georges Pompidou, Paris
2006 Roberts & Tilton, New York
2009 Moderna Museet, Stockholm
2016 Harmony Murphy Gallery, LA
2019 The Whatcom Museum, Bellingham WA

Notes

1937 births
Living people
American artists